MV Red Jet 3 is a passenger catamaran ferry formerly operated by Red Funnel on their route from Southampton to Cowes on the Isle of Wight along with sister ships Red Jet 4, Red Jet 5 and Red Jet 6. She was built by FB Marine on the Isle of Wight, United Kingdom  at a cost of £2.73 million and entered service in 1998.  The ship reached a speed of 37.4 Knots during a publicity cruise on 14 July 1998 before entering into regular service on 27 July 1998. This entry into service meant that the older Shearwater 5 and Shearwater 6 hydrofoils were no longer needed to provide backup for the Red Funnel high speed service and they were withdrawn. The high speed fleet then consisted of Red Jet 1, Red Jet 2 and Red Jet 3.

In March 2019, Red Jet 3 was sold to Adriatic Fast Ferries, a ferry company operating in Split, Croatia. Red Jet 3  entered service with Adriatic later in the year, where it now operates under the name Adriatic Express.

See also
Red Jet 1
Red Jet 2
Red Jet 4
Red Jet 5
Red Jet 6
Red Jet 7

References

Red Jet 3 specification

External links

Ferries of England
Ferry transport on the Isle of Wight
1999 ships
Individual catamarans
Ships of Red Funnel